Puerto Rico Capitals was a women's soccer team based in Ponce, Puerto Rico. They played in the Women's Premier Soccer League (WPSL), the third tier of women's soccer in the United States and Canada, from 2008–2010. The team played in the Sunshine Conference.

The team was established in 2007 as Puerto Rico's first professional women's soccer team. In their inaugural 2008 season they played at Yldefonso Solá Morales Stadium in Caguas, Puerto Rico. The following season they relocated to Ponce. They folded after the 2010 season. The club's colors were pink, royal blue, red and white.

Players

Current roster

Honors

History
The Capitals were founded in 2007, becoming the first professional women's soccer team in Puerto Rico, and the first team in the Women's Premier Soccer League to play outside of the continental United States. The club had a senior WPSL team and a junior U-17 developmental squad. Originally based in Caguas, Puerto Rico, they relocated to the city of Ponce in 2009. They folded after the 2010 season.

Coaches
 Robert Parr 2008–present

Stadia
 Yldefonso Solá Morales Stadium, Caguas, Puerto Rico 2008–present

Average attendance

See also 
 Puerto Rican Football Federation

References

External links
 Futbol de Puerto Rico

   

Women's Premier Soccer League teams
Association football clubs established in 2007
Football clubs in Puerto Rico
2007 establishments in Puerto Rico
2010 disestablishments in Puerto Rico